Amphithrix is a genus of snout moths. It was described by Ragonot, in 1893, and contains one species, Amphithrix sublineatella. It is found in Spain, Portugal, France, Corsica, Sicily and Croatia.

The wingspan is 18–24 mm.

References

Phycitini
Monotypic moth genera
Moths of Europe
Moths described in 1859
Pyralidae genera